Constancia Nery (born 1936 in Ipiguá, Sao Paulo, Brazil) is a Latin American Naïve Art painter.  Nery is considered a revolutionary Naive Art painter in the Latin American landscape which yielded a number of widely known artist in this space and one of the youngest selling Naive Art painters today. Neri resides in Curitiba, Parana, Brazil.

Prizes
1984 Bronze Medal, International Center of Contemporary Art, Paris
1985 Silver Medal, Winter Salon of Lisbon, Lisbon, Portugal
2002 Suisse Prize and Europe Prize of Primitive & Modern Painting, Gallery Pro Arte Kasper Morges, Switzerland

Public collections
Musée d'Art Naïf - Max Fourny, Paris
MAN Naïve Art Museum, Beraut, France
Fundacao Cultural Solar do rosario, Curitiba, Brazil

References
"L’Arbre et les Naifs", Max Fourny, 1990, Paris“Naïve Art in Brazil”, Jacques Ardies, 1998, São Paulo
“Brasil-Visao Artistica”, Brazil, 2001
“Arte e Raizes”, Brinquedos e Brincadeiras, 2001, São Paulo

External links
Constancia Nery’s paintings at GINA – International Gallery of Naiva Art

1936 births
Living people
20th-century Brazilian women artists
21st-century Brazilian women artists
21st-century Brazilian artists
Brazilian painters
Brazilian women painters
People from São Paulo (state)